Azilda station is a Via Rail flag stop station located in Azilda, Ontario, in the city of Greater Sudbury community of Rayside-Balfour. It is on the Canadian Pacific Railway transcontinental main line, and is served by the regional rail Sudbury – White River train.

References

External links

Via Rail stations in Ontario
Railway stations in Greater Sudbury
Canadian Pacific Railway stations in Ontario